Black God's Shadow is a collection of fantasy short stories by American writer C. L. Moore and illustrator Alicia Austin. It was first published in 1977 by Donald M. Grant, Publisher, Inc. in an edition of 2,550 copies, of which 150 were bound in buckram, boxed, and signed by the author and artist. The stories feature Moore's character Jirel of Joiry, and originally appeared in the magazine Weird Tales. The stories were previously collected in a different configuration under the title Jirel of Joiry (1969).

Contents
 "Black God's Kiss"
 "Black God's Shadow"
 "Jirel Meets Magic"
 "The Dark Land"
 "Hellsgarde"

General references
 
 
 

1977 short story collections
Fantasy short story collections
Books illustrated by Alicia Austin
Donald M. Grant, Publisher books